Blythefield Country Club is a private country club and golf course in the central United States, located in Belmont, Michigan, a suburb northeast of Grand Rapids. Founded  in 1928, the par-72 golf course opened the following June and measures  from the back tees.

Blythefield has hosted the Meijer LPGA Classic on the LPGA Tour since its debut in 2014, and was the site of the Western Open on the PGA Tour in 1961, won by Arnold Palmer, two strokes ahead of

References

External links

Golf clubs and courses in Michigan
Buildings and structures in Kent County, Michigan
1977 establishments in Michigan